Lee Jung Seob (April 10, 1916 in Pyeongannamdo – September 6, 1956 in Seoul) was a Korean artist, most known for his oil paintings such as "White Ox".

Life 
Born and raised during Korea under Japanese rule, Lee was greatly inspired by his high school art teacher Lim Yong Ryeon. He entered Teikoku Art School for Occidental Painting in Japan in 1932 and studied Art in earnest. He abruptly quit and entered Bunka Gakuin (Japanese: 文化學院), which was more fascinated with the avant-garde than Teikoku. At Bunka Gakuin, Lee showed Fauvist tendencies and a strong, free-like drawing style. He met a woman named Yamamoto Masako (Japanese: 山本方子, Korean name Lee Nam-deok, in hangul: 이남덕) who would later become his wife.

Lee graduated from Bunka Gakuen in 1944 during the last stage of World War II, and married Masako the following year. In 1946, their first child was born but suddenly died from diphtheria. At that time, he was preparing an exhibition and making artwork as an unknown artist. The sudden death of his child greatly affected him. He sent his painting "A Child Flies with a White Star", which was inspired by his loss, to the exhibition commemorating the independence of Korea in 1947.

Following the outbreak of the Korean War, Lee frequently moved around the country. He took refuge in Busan with his first son, Taehyun, who was born in 1947, and his second son, Taeseong who was born in 1949. With a fear of the war's progress, he fled to Jeju. Due to financial hardships and safety, he sent Masako and his two sons to Japan initially as a temporary arrangement. Lee would send letters and postcards with drawings to his family, expressing his love and longing to see them again. He picked up a job as a crafts teacher. However, due to hardships, he was never able to save up enough money to move and be reunited. He never met his family again except for a short meeting for 5 days in Tokyo in 1953.

Lee later returned to the capital of Seoul. In 1955, he held only one private exhibition at the Midopa Gallery. He suffered from a type of schizophrenia credited to longings for his family and stress from life hardships. In his loneliness, Lee turned to alcohol and died of hepatitis in 1956 in Seoul.

His style was influenced by Fauvism and his themes were very characteristic and indigenous. He made great contributions to the introduction of Western styles in Korea. Lee also made line drawings with an awl on packs of cigarettes.

In 1995, The Lee Jung Seob Art Gallery was built in his honor at the center of the so-called "Lee Jung-Seob's Art Street" (a part of Olle Route 6) in Seogwipo, Jeju. The location holds a geographical significance and meaning for many of his pieces; Lee created some of the greatest paintings in the history of Korean modern art during his stay at Seogwipo.

Paintings

Lee Jung Seob has produced many works during his lifetime. Some of his paintings include:

"White Ox" – 흰 소, 1954 (exhibited in Museum of Modern Art)
"Fighting Ox" – 싸우는 소 
"Fish and the Kids" – 물고기와 아이들, 1950
"The Family and the Dove" – 가족과 비둘기, 1956

See also
 List of Korean painters
 Korean art

References

External links 
 Lee Jung Seob Museum
 Naver Cast – Lee Jung-seob
 Doosan Encyclopedia – Lee Jung-seob
 Encyclopedia of Korean Culture – Lee Jung-seob

1916 births
1956 deaths
Korean artists
People from South Pyongan